Toydrum are an English musical duo formed in 2011 by former Unkle band members and record producers Pablo Clements and James Griffith. The pair work out of their Brighton studio, The Toyrooms, where they wrote and recorded their debut EP, Distant Focus Vol 1 (2014), and the subsequent Evangelist (2015), with Gavin Clark.

In 2015, the duo composed and produced the score to the film London Fields, directed by Mathew Cullen.

Clements and Griffith wrote and produced music for Shane Meadows' series This Is England '90, under the name Evangelist, a project they started with Gavin Clark and Clayhill.

At the end of 2015, Toydrum finished the score to Christopher Smith's Detour. The film premiered at the Tribeca Film Festival on 16 April 2016. The score was shortlisted for a BIFA Award.

In 2016, they also worked with Alice Lowe on the score to her first feature film, Prevenge, which premiered at the Venice and Toronto film festivals.

Discography
Albums
 Distant Focus Vol 1 (EP – 2014)
 Evangelist (2015)
 My Eye on You (To Reinvision) (2017)
 Fields of Madness (EP – 2018)

Contributions and appearances
 Noel Gallagher – Where the City Meets the Sky – Chasing Yesterday: The Remixes (2015)

Film and television
 Montana (2014)
 This Is England '90 (2015)
 Prevenge (2016)
 Detour (2016)
 Future World (2018)
 London Fields (2018)
 Deep Water  (2019)
 Two Weeks to Live (2020)
 Soulmates (2020)
 The Banishing (2020)
 Sweetheart (2021)
 Tell Me Everything (2022)
 Slow Horses (2022)
 Three Pines (2022)

References

External links
 

English electronic music duos